The Adelaide Invitational (formerly Adelaide Track Classic) is an annual one-day outdoor track and field meeting held in Adelaide, Australia. It is part of the national Australian Athletics Tour alongside other competitions including the Sydney Track Classic. The Adelaide Invitational also features as part of the World Athletics Continental Tour, first featuring in the 2022 edition as a challenger level meet (also referred to as category D).

Meet Records

Men

Women

References

External links
Adelaide Track Classic results submitted by Athletics Australia

Annual track and field meetings
Athletics competitions in Australia
Sport in Adelaide